Alas, 	Alas-Kluet, or Batak Alas, is an Austronesian language of Sumatra. The three dialects, Alas, Kluet, and Singkil (Kade-Kade), may not constitute a single language; Alas may be closer to Karo, and the others closer to Dairi. By linguistic affiliation, Alas–Kluet belongs to the Batak subgroup. Ethnically, however, its speakers generally do not identify as Batak, mostly because of their religion.

See also 
 Alas people
 Kluet people
 Singkil people

References

Further reading 
 

Batak languages
Languages of Aceh
Languages of Sumatra